Ahmet Erol (1 January 1921 – 15 June 2012) was a Turkish footballer. He played in four matches for the Turkey national football team from 1948 to 1949. He was also part of Turkey's squad for the football tournament at the 1948 Summer Olympics, but he did not play in any matches.

References

External links
 

1921 births
2012 deaths
Turkish footballers
Turkey international footballers
Place of birth missing
Association football defenders
Gençlerbirliği S.K. footballers
Fenerbahçe S.K. footballers